The Tombs of the Old Heroes (German - Grabmale alter Helden) is an oil on canvas painting by Caspar David Friedrich, painted between April and August 1812. It is also known as The Graves of the Fallen Freedom Fighters (Gräber gefallener Freiheitskrieger) or Arminius's Grave (Grab des Arminius). It is now in the Hamburger Kunsthalle. As its alternative titles suggest, it was produced during an era of renewed interest in Arminius and his struggle against the Romans, an era which also produced the Hermannsdenkmal.

See also
List of works by Caspar David Friedrich

References

External links

1812 paintings
Paintings by Caspar David Friedrich
Paintings in the Hamburger Kunsthalle
Arminius